The Gyeonggang Line (경강선) is a rail line in South Korea, which at present comprises two distinct sections. The first one, which opened on September 24, 2016, is part of the Seoul Metropolitan Subway system in Gyeonggi-do, South Korea, and runs from the city of Seongnam to Yeoju City, partially coinciding with the route of the former narrow-gauge Suryeo Line. The second section, which is located entirely in Gangwon Province, runs between Gangneung and Wonju and opened on December 22, 2017, in anticipation of the 2018 Winter Olympics. This section of the line offers KTX service from Seoul, through the Jungang Line. In the future, the two sections are to be connected, and the Gyeonggang Line will be extended westwards to Siheung.

History
September 24, 2016: The first section of the line opens from Pangyo to Yeoju.
December 22, 2017: The second section of the line opens from Seowonju station to Gangneung station.

Future
The Gyeonggang Line is planned to run all the way from Incheon to Wonju. The line is planned to be extended west of Pangyo to Wolgot on the existing Suin Line, and east of Yeoju to Seowonju.

Rolling stock
Korail Class 371000 (12 trains)

Stations

Pangyo-Yeoju
This section opened in September 2016. Initially, the line utilizes Class 371000 cars.

Wolgot-Pangyo
This section is expected to start construction soon but will open no earlier than 2025.

Seowonju-Gangneung
This section opened on December 22, 2017, just before the 2018 Winter Olympics. It is different line, so it is called the Gangneung Line. The line offers KTX-Eum services. This line is designated as semi-high-speed line.

Yeoju-Seowonju
There are currently no planned stations for this section.

References

 
 

 
Seoul Metropolitan Subway lines